Shenzhen Energy Group Company Limited, formerly Shenzhen Energy Investment Company Limited, is one of the main power generation companies in Shenzhen, Guangdong, China. It involves in developing all types of energies, researching and investing high new energy-related technologies. Huaneng Power International is now the second largest shareholder of Shenzhen Energy.

On 3 April 2010 a tanker owned by the Shenzhen Energy Group ran aground on Australia's Great Barrier Reef after straying out of shipping lanes.

2010 Great Barrier Reef grounding 

References

External links
 

China Huaneng Group
Companies based in Shenzhen
Energy companies established in 1993
Companies owned by the provincial government of China
Electric power companies of China
Companies listed on the Shenzhen Stock Exchange